Hemicycla saulcyi is a species of gastropod in the family Helicidae. It is endemic to Spain.

References

Sources

Endemic fauna of the Canary Islands
Molluscs of the Canary Islands
Hemicycla
Endemic fauna of Spain
Gastropods described in 1839
Taxonomy articles created by Polbot